The Austrian Football Bundesliga ("Austrian Football Federal League"), also known as Admiral Bundesliga for sponsorship reasons, is the top level of the Austrian football league system. The competition decides the Austrian national football champions, as well the country's entrants for the various European cups run by UEFA. Since Austria stayed in sixteenth place in the UEFA association coefficient rankings at the end of the 2015–16 season, the league gained its first spot for the UEFA Champions League for the 2016-2017 season.

The Austrian Bundesliga, which began in the 1974–75 season, has been a separate registered association since 1 December 1991. It has been won the most by the two Viennese giants Austria Wien, who were national champions 24 times, and Rapid Wien, who won the national title 32 times. The current champions are Red Bull Salzburg. Phillip Thonhauser is president of the Austrian Bundesliga. The Austrian Football Bundesliga is currently known as Admiral Bundesliga for sponsorship reasons.

History

1900–1938
Football has been played in Austria since around 1890. Around the turn of the twentieth century two attempts were made to start a national championship. From 1900 onwards, a cup competition was played in Vienna, the Neues Wiener Tagblatt Pokal. This cup was actually played in league format.
The efforts to create a football league succeeded in 1911, with the introduction of the first Austrian football championship. The competition for this championship, the 1. Klasse (First Class), was created and organized by the Niederösterreichischer Fußball-Verband (the Lower Austrian Football Federation), and the participants played for the title of Niederösterreichische Landesmeister (Lower Austrian National Champion). From 1924, the league was considered professional and changed its name to I. Liga (First League).
In 1929, an all-Austrian amateur championship was first played, won by Grazer AK. Clubs from the professional league in Vienna were not part of this competition. Teams from the other states of Austria were first allowed to join the highest division with the introduction of the Nationalliga (National League) in the season of 1937–38.

1938–1945

Austria's annexation by Germany in 1938 brought the Austrian Nationalliga to an early end. Numerous teams were disbanded and some players fled out of the country. The Austrian Nationalliga was integrated into the system of the NSRL, the Sports office of the Third Reich as the Gau XVII section under Gaufachwart Hans Janisch. Despised by Nazis as unworthy of a true German, professionalism in sports was outlawed in May 1938. "Innovations" like the Hitler salute were introduced as compulsory before and after every game. Teams, like Hakoah Wien were banned and others, like Austria Wien were first closed and then renamed. Finally, the operation of the junior teams was handed over to the local Hitlerjugend units.
The new highest league in what had been Austria, the Gauliga Ostmark, was an amateur league and covered the whole of the former country except Tyrol and Vorarlberg, which were added to the Bavarian league system. The league champions now qualified for the German football championship, which Rapid Wien won in 1941. From 1941, the league was renamed Gauliga Donau-Alpenland to further eradicate the memory of Austria as an independent country.
Following Nazi Germany's defeat in World War II and the disbandment of the NSRL, Austria's teams were excluded again from the German league.

1945–1974
The league returned to a Vienna-only format in 1945, briefly named 1. Klasse once more before changing to just Liga in 1946.
Only upon the introduction of the all-Austrian Staatsliga A in 1949 did teams from the whole federal territory finally play for the Austrian Championship. However, the road to organising the Staatsliga proved difficult. A conflict between the representatives of the amateur and the professional aspects of the sport led to the separation of the Viennese league from the football federation, and to the establishment of its own competition on 30 June 1949. At the statutory Presidential Election Council of the Austrian Football Association only a few days later a surprising turn took place – upon the request of Lower Austria, the introduction of the Staatsliga was finally and unanimously confirmed. The organization was in the hands of the Fußballstaatsliga Österreich, created for this purpose. A Staatsliga B, the second division of national league football, was formed in 1950. This league, however, was disbanded again in 1959, whereby the Staatsliga A dropped the A from its name, the need for differentiating having been gone.
In 1965, however, the Austrian Football Association again took over the organization of the top division, with the (second) introduction of the Nationalliga.
On 21 April 1974, against the vote of the Vorarlberg association, the introduction of the Bundesliga was decided. The Nationalliga remained as the second division, for now.

1974 to current
In the 1974–75 season the Bundesliga was introduced which, still led by the Austrian Football Association, aligned both of the highest divisions in Austria. In 1976, the Nationalliga was renamed to Bundesliga – Second Division while the Bundesliga was now called Bundesliga – First Division.
From 1974 to 1982 the league operated with ten clubs with each club playing the other four times during the season. From 1982 to 1985 it played with sixteen clubs with each club playing the others twice. The league's modus was changed in 1985 to a twelve team league which played a home -and away round in autumn. The top eight clubs then advanced to the championship round (Officially: Oberes Play-off) who again played each other twice. The bottom four of the autumn round played the top four of the First League to determine the four teams to play in the Bundesliga in the following season. This modus was used for the next eight seasons until 1993 when the league returned to the ten team format it originally operated in.
26 years after dissolution of the independent Staatsliga on 17 November 1991, the Austrian Football Bundesliga was reconstituted as a federation and admitted on 1 December 1991 to the Austrian Football Association as its 10th member.
Beginning with the 2018-19 season the league expanded from its current 10 teams to 12 teams.

Tasks and legal form
Since 1991 the Bundesliga has carried its own responsibility as a separate association, and organises the championships of the two highest divisions in Austria. Both are named after their sponsors; since 2014 the Bundesliga is named after sports-betting company, Tipico. The second division, called the "Erste Liga" or "First League," is sponsored by Sky Go. In addition the Bundesliga is responsible for the Toto Jugendliga, leagues for under 15/17/19 Teams of professional Clubs and academies. The Bundesliga also represents professional football in Austria, in co-operation with the football clubs themselves.
The Bundesliga is legally a non-profit organisation. The twenty teams of the Tipico Bundesliga and the Sky Go Erste Liga constitute the members of the Bundesliga. The Bundesliga is represented by an acting executive committee, which supports a supervisory board. Each association of the two professional leagues is represented in presidential conferences; these have advisory function in all affairs concerning the Bundesliga.

Scopes of responsibility of the senates
The 'senates' are organising committees which consist of honorary and committee-members independent of the clubs. The first senate is responsible for suspensions and for the running of championship games. The second senate functions as an arbitration board for financial disagreements, the third senate is responsible for all financial concerns and the fourth senate is the panel of referees for the Bundesliga.
The evaluation of a club's economic competency which is required in order to obtain a playing license for the two professional leagues takes place at the fifth senate, the Bundesliga license committee.

Objectives
The Austrian Bundesliga carries the obligation for a positive development of football as a sport at the élite level, as well as for the advancement of the next generation of players in co-operation with the teams at the junior levels of the sport. To accomplish this, the Bundesliga requires economic audits of the teams, the introduction of laws particular to professional football, TV marketing, centralised sponsorship and collective marketing for all teams.

Bundesliga
In the Bundesliga, twelve teams play a "double championship", with each team playing every other twice at home and twice away during a championship year, which is divided into an autumn and a spring season. The season typically lasts from July to June of the following year. At the end of the season, the team finishing in last place in the table is relegated to the Sky Go Erste Liga, the champion of which is promoted to the Bundesliga.

Member clubs for the 2022–23 season
The Bundesliga champion and the second placed team qualify for the UEFA Champions League, the Austrian Cup winner enters the playoff round of the UEFA Europa League while the team in 4th position, as well as the winner of the Europa Conference League play-offs enter the UEFA Europa Conference League. In the event that the Bundesliga champion is also the Austrian Cup winner, the third-placed team enters the UEFA Europa League.

List of champions

Performance

Performance by club

Notes:
  All teams are defunct clubs from Innsbruck, Tirol. Wacker Innsbruck (1915–99), Swarovski Tirol (1986–92) and Tirol Innsbruck (1993–02). They are considered to be the continuation of the each other.
  The Red Bull company bought the club on 6 April 2005 and rebranded it. Prior to 2005 the team was known as SV Austria Salzburg or Casino Salzburg. They also changed the colours from white-violet in red-white. The Violet-Whites ultimately formed a new club, Austria Salzburg.
  Admira Wacker Mödling was formed after the merger of SK Admira Wien and SC Wacker Wien in 1971, under the name of Admira Wacker Wien, the merge with VfB Mödling in 1997 and the merge with SK Schwadorf in 2008. The new team play in Mödling.

Performance by city

Top scorers in Bundesliga

All-time top scorers

 Bold denotes players still playing in Bundesliga.

Statistics

UEFA coefficients

The following data indicates Austrian coefficient rankings between European football leagues.

Country ranking
UEFA League Ranking as of 15 March 2019:
 9.  (11)  Scottish Football Association (29.000)
 10.  (10)  Austrian Football Bundesliga (28.450)
 11.  (12)  Ukrainian Association of Football (28.400)
 12.  (9)  Royal Belgian Football Association (24.800)
 13.  (16)  Football Association of Serbia (23.875)

Club ranking
UEFA 5-year Club Ranking as of 8 July 2021:
 22.  Red Bull Salzburg (57.000)
 54.  LASK (23.000)
 93.  Rapid Wien (14.500)
 111.  Wolfsberger AC (11.000)
 138.  FK Austria Wien (7.500)

See also

 Football in Austria
 Austrian Footballer of the Year
 Austrian Cup
 Gauliga Ostmark – the highest division in Austria from 1938 to 1945

Notes

References

External links

 Official site
 Bundesliga site 
 OEFB 
  League321.com - Austrian football league tables, records & statistics database. 
 Austria - List of Champions, RSSSF.com

 
1
Austria
1974 establishments in Austria
Sports leagues established in 1974
Football
Professional sports leagues in Austria